Joseph Gilbert may refer to:

Joseph Gilbert (Royal Navy officer) (1732–1821), English naval officer, Master of HMS Resolution on Cook's second voyage
Joseph Gilbert (minister) (1779–1852), English Congregational minister
Joseph Gilbert (politician) (20th century), Grenadian politician
Joe Gilbert (musician) (1940–1966), American singer, of Joe and Eddie
Joseph Gilbert (RAF officer) (born 1931), British air marshal
Joseph Henry Gilbert (1817–1901), English chemist
Joseph Gilbert (winemaker) (1800–1881), South Australian pastoralist
Joe Gilbert (baseball) (born 1952), former Major League Baseball pitcher
Joey Gilbert (born 1976), retired professional boxer
Joseph Trounsell Gilbert (1888–1975), Bermudan barrister, judge and politician
Joseph Francis Gilbert, British landscape painter and draughtsman
Joe Gilbert (American football), college and nfl coach

See also 
 Edward Joseph Gilbert (born 1936), American born Catholic bishop of the Antilles
 Sir Gilbert Joseph Cullen Dyett, CMG (1891–1964), Australian World War I veteran
 Joseph Gilbert Totten (1788–1864), fought in the War of 1812
 Joseph Gilbert Hamilton (1907–1957), American professor of medical physics
 Nicolas Joseph Laurent Gilbert (1750–1780), French poet
 Tookie Gilbert (Harold Joseph Gilbert, 1929–1967), American first baseman